Marvin Chodorow (July 16, 1913 – October 17, 2005) was an American physicist who pioneered in uses of Klystron microwave tubes.

Chodorow was a member of the National Academy of Sciences and the National Academy of Engineering (elected to NAE in 1967 "for microwave tube research and development").
Chodorow was the founding chairman of the department of applied physics of the Stanford University.

Chronology 
Chodorow was born in Buffalo, New York. He received BS in Physics in 1934 from the University at Buffalo, and a PhD in Physics from Massachusetts Institute of Technology in 1939, under the supervision of John Clarke Slater.
He was a member of faculty of City College of New York and Pennsylvania State University before joining Stanford University in 1947.
He spent the rest of his career at Stanford, becoming a professor in physics and electrical engineering in 1954, and the head of the division of physics and electrical engineering of Stanford University in 1962.

References 

1913 births
2005 deaths
Stanford University Department of Applied Physics faculty
City College of New York faculty
Pennsylvania State University faculty
MIT Department of Physics alumni
Members of the United States National Academy of Engineering
Scientists from Buffalo, New York
Members of the United States National Academy of Sciences
University at Buffalo alumni
IEEE Lamme Medal recipients